Thau may refer to:

People
 Thau (surname), a surname (including a list of people with the surname)
 Tạ Thu Thâu (1906–1945), Vietnamese Trotskyist

Places
 Étang de Thau, a lagoon in southern France

Other
 Thau, a letter of the Tocharian alphabet

See also
 Thaumaturgy
 Thaw (disambiguation)
 Thou (disambiguation)